Marshall Earle Reid (August 31, 1887 – December 5, 1955) was an early aviator.

Biography
He was born on August 31, 1887 in Philadelphia to Josephine Elizabeth Myers and Marshall Earl Reid Sr.

On May 4, 1912 he started from Hempstead, Long Island intending to fly to Philadelphia. Near Elizabeth, New Jersey his biplane crashed but Reid and his passenger George William Beatty crash-landed without injury.

On October 11, 1912 he and Henry Croskey Mustin, his brother-in-law (his sister Helen R. Reid Mustin's husband's brother), flew from Cape May Point, New Jersey.

On June 8, 1912 he was able to travel from Staten Island to Trenton, New Jersey at 75 miles per hour.

He died on December 5, 1955 at his home in Baltimore, Maryland.

References

External links
Marshall Earl Reid at Early Aviators

Members of the Early Birds of Aviation
1887 births
1955 deaths
People from Staten Island